Khmer nationalism (or Cambodian nationalism) is a form of nationalism found in Cambodia, which asserts that Khmers (Cambodians) are a nation and that promotes the cultural unity of the Khmer (Cambodian) race.

"Young Monks" Movement
Another division in the Cambodian sangha can be seen in what has been called the "young monks" movement, a small group of politically active monks (primarily Maha Nikaya) voicing public opposition to the current government. The "young monks" are primarily junior members of the clergy, drawn from temples in and around Phnom Penh.  Unlike the Engaged modernists, their interest is not in using the authority of the sangha to aide social development programs, but rather to express direct opposition to government policies and corruption.  Since the 1993 UN-monitored elections, monks have been permitted to vote in Cambodia (a move opposed by some senior monks).  While this has not resulted in any large-scale mobilization of the sangha as a political force, it has drawn some young monks farther into participation in parliamentary politics.  Many of these young monks are associated with opposition figure Sam Rainsy and his political party, the SRP.

Members of the young monks movement have participated in and organized public demonstrations in Phnom Penh, aimed at drawing attention to perceived government misdeeds.  The Maha Nikaya hierarchy has condemned this form of political activism, calling for the arrest of some monks and defrocking others.

Emergence of Khmer nationalism
Unlike in Vietnam, Cambodian nationalism remained relatively quiet during much of French rule mostly due to lesser education influence, which helped literacy rates remain low and prevented nationalist movements like those taking place in Vietnam. However, among the French-educated Cambodian elite, the Western ideas of democracy and self-rule as well as French restoration of monuments such as Angkor Wat created a sense of pride and awareness of Cambodia's once powerful status in the past. In education, there was also growing resentment among Cambodian students of the minority Vietnamese holding a more favored status. In 1936, Son Ngoc Than and Pach Choeun began publishing Nagaravatta (Notre cité) as a French language anti-colonial and at times, anti-Vietnamese newspaper. Minor independence movements, especially the Khmer Issarak, began to develop in 1940 among Cambodians in Thailand, who feared that their actions would have led to punishment if they had operated in their homeland.

Khmer Nationalism and Buddhism

Cambodian Buddhism was instrumental in fomenting Khmer national identity and the independence movement in the 20th century, leading to Cambodian independence as a sovereign state.

In their attempt to separate the Khmer people from their cultural allegiance to the neighboring Theravada kingdom of Siam, the French "protectors" nurtured a sense of Khmer identity by emphasizing Khmer-language studies and Khmer Buddhist studies. They established Pali schools within Cambodia to keep the Cambodian monks from travelling to Siam for higher education. These Khmer-language study centres became the birthplace of Cambodian nationalism.

Khmer Rouge 

 

In 1975 when the Khmer Rouge took control of Cambodia, they tried to completely destroy Buddhism and they very nearly succeeded. By the time of the Vietnamese invasion in 1979, nearly every monk and religious scholar had been either murdered or driven into exile, and nearly every Buddhist temple and library had been destroyed.

The Khmer Rouge's policies towards Buddhism – which included the forcible disrobing of monks, the destruction of monasteries, and, ultimately, the execution of uncooperative monks – effectively destroyed Cambodia's Buddhist institutions.  Monks who did not flee and avoided execution lived among the laity, sometimes, they secretly performed Buddhist rituals for the sick or afflicted.

Estimates of the number of monks in Cambodia prior to the ascension of the Khmer Rouge vary, they range from 65,000 to 80,000.  By the time of the Buddhist restoration in the early 1980s, the number of Cambodian monks worldwide was estimated to be less than 3,000.  The patriarchs of both Cambodian nikayas perished sometime during the period 1975–78, though the cause of their deaths is not known.

Due to their association with the Thai monarchy, monks of the Thommayut order may have been particularly targeted for persecution.

New Era of Cambodian Society 

In 2018, Hun Sen and the ruling party of Cambodian People's Party had won all 125 seats in the National Assembly after its election in 2018 Cambodian general election to become the new era of One-party rule of all Cambodia like most of the former French Indochina including Vietnam and Laos with both ruling parties in 1975 starting with Lao People's Revolutionary Party and the Communist Party of Vietnam to maintain peace, security and development. like Cambodia, the CPP has its Khmer nationalism which controlled the entire country and its population with King Norodom Sihamoni in Phnom Penh. In June 2020, The Cambodian People's Party headquarters was officially inaugurated for its entire generation for all Cambodian citizens.

References

 
Political history of Cambodia